The tympanic duct or scala tympani is one of the perilymph-filled cavities in the inner ear of humans. It is separated from the cochlear duct by the basilar membrane, and it extends from the round window to the helicotrema, where it continues as vestibular duct.

The purpose of the perilymph-filled tympanic duct and vestibular duct is to transduce the movement of air that causes the tympanic membrane and the ossicles to vibrate, to movement of liquid and the basilar membrane. This movement is conveyed to the organ of Corti inside the cochlear duct, composed of hair cells attached to the basilar membrane and their stereocilia embedded in the tectorial membrane. The movement of the basilar membrane compared to the tectorial membrane causes the stereocilia to bend. They then depolarise and send impulses to the brain via the cochlear nerve. This produces the sensation of sound.

Additional images

See also
Scala vestibuli
Hearing

External links
 Slide from University of Kansas
 Diagram at IUPUI
 Image at University of New England, Maine

Auditory system
Ear

Otology
Audiology